
Corozal American Cemetery and Memorial is located approximately 3 miles west of Panama City, Panama. It is in the city of Corozal and is the location of 5,528 American veterans and others. A paved walkway leads from the Visitors' Center to a small memorial that sits atop a knoll overlooking the graves area. The memorial was established in 1923 by Congress to remember people who served overseas. It consists of a paved plaza with a 12-foot rectangular granite obelisk flanked by two flagpoles on which fly the United States and Panamanian flags.

The plaza obelisk has engravings in Spanish and English. The English inscription reads:

The American Battle Monuments Commission assumed responsibility for the care and maintenance of the Corozal American Cemetery in Panama in 1982. The cemetery is open Monday through Friday to the public from 9 a.m. to 4 p.m. except December 25 and January 1. It is open on weekends only to relatives who have family buried there. (Family members must present ID and proof of their relationship.) It is open on host country holidays. When the cemetery is open to the public, a staff member is on duty in the Visitors' Center to answer questions and escort relatives to grave and memorial sites.

Corozal "Silver" Cemetery
The Corozal "Silver Roll" Cemetery is an area adjacent to the Corozal American Cemetery and Memorial. The Silver Cemetery was originally established as a segregated cemetery for the "Silver Roll" (Black people of West Indian origin) employees of the Panama Canal. In 2010 the Corozal "Silver" Cemetery was added as a World Monuments Fund (WMF) Watch Site.

See also
 American Battle Monuments Commission

References

External links
 Official website, Corozal
 
 CWGC – Commonwealth War Graves Commission listing for 15 graves at the cemetery.

Cemeteries in Panama
United States federal boards, commissions, and committees
American Battle Monuments Commission